Kozolin  is a village within the administrative district of Gmina Raciąż, in Płońsk County, Masovian Voivodeship, located in east-central Poland.

References

Kozolin